Nuuk Stadium is a multi-purpose venue in Nuuk, Greenland. It is currently used mostly for football matches. It has a capacity for 2,000.

FIFA 2-star artificial turf was installed on the pitch in July 2016. The 2-star rating is the highest achievable rating for an artificial surface and is suitable for all UEFA competitions.

Venue
It can also be used as an entertainment venue. On November 2, 2007, Scottish rock band Nazareth, of "Love Hurts" fame, performed at the venue, and on April 1, 2011, the venue was visited by Suzi Quatro.

See also
Arktisk Stadion

References

External links

Football venues in Greenland
Greenland
Multi-purpose stadiums in Greenland
Buildings and structures in Nuuk
Sport in Nuuk
Greenland national football team